Events from the year 1676 in Ireland.

Incumbent
Monarch: Charles II

Events
July 31 – the title Viscount Lanesborough is first created in the Peerage of Ireland in favour of George Lane, 2nd Baronet, of Tulsk.
August 28 – Irish Donation of 1676 is shipped from Dublin to relieve Boston in the Massachusetts Bay Colony. 
Froinsias Ó Maolmhuaidh's Lucerna fidelium, seu, Fasciclus decerptus ab authoribus magis versatis qui tractarunt de doctrin a Christiana (Lochrann na gCreidmheach), an Irish language catechism of Catholic Church doctrine is published by the Congregation of Propaganda Fide in Rome.

Births
William Handcock, politician (d. 1723)
John Rogerson, lawyer and politician (d. 1741)
Owen Swiny, theatrical impresario and art dealer (d. 1754)
Caleb Threlkeld, botanist (d. 1728)
approximate date – John Moore, 1st Baron Moore, politician (d. 1725)

Deaths
John-Baptist Hackett, Dominican theologian.
Richard Lynch, Jesuit theologian (b. 1611)

References

 
1670s in Ireland
Ireland
Years of the 17th century in Ireland